Alexander, Alex or Alec Hope may refer to:
A. D. Hope (Alec Derwent Hope, 1907–2000), Australian poet and essayist
Alexander Beresford Hope (1820–1887), British author and politician
Alex Hope School
Alexander Hope (British Army officer) (1769–1837), British general and politician
Alexander W. Hope (died 1856), Los Angeles County sheriff and California state senator
Alexander Campbell Hope (1894–1978), farmer and politician in British Columbia, Canada
Alex Hope (songwriter) (born 1993), Australian songwriter

See also
Hope (surname)